"Bring Back My Happiness" is a song by American electronica musician Moby. It was released as the sixth and final single from his third studio album Everything Is Wrong on September 5, 1995. The single reached number 10 on the Billboard dance chart.

The single cover for the song (and the video occasionally) features "Little Idiot", an animated character which would later appear on some music videos and single and album covers.

Track listing 
 CD single 
 "Bring Back My Happiness"  – 3:35
 "In My Life" – 3:35
 "Bring Back My Happiness"  – 5:08
 "Bring Back My Happiness"  – 5:44
 "Bring Back My Happiness"  – 8:09
 "Into the Blue"  – 8:11
 "Alone" – 10:49
 12-inch single 
 "Bring Back My Happiness"  – 3:35
 "Bring Back My Happiness"  – 5:08
 "Bring Back My Happiness"  – 8:09
 "Bring Back My Happiness"  – 5:44
 CD single 
 "Bring Back My Happiness"  – 3:35
 "Bring Back My Happiness"  – 4:14
 "Bring Back My Happiness"  – 8:09
 "Bring Back My Happiness"  – 5:08
 "Bring Back My Happiness"  – 5:04

Charts

References

External links
 

Moby songs
1995 singles
Songs written by Moby
1995 songs
Mute Records singles